Ferma is a settlement in the municipality of Ierapetra on the island of Crete. It is situated at the coast, 11 kilometers east of Ierapetra.

References 

Ierapetra
Crete